A  (also ,  or ) is a short winter coat and an item of traditional Japanese clothing. The  started to be worn, especially by the common people, in the 18th century, during Japan's Edo period (1603-1867). 

The facing and lining are padded with thick layer of wadded cotton for warmth. The collar is usually made of black sateen.  often display a family crest or other designs.

See also
 , a Chinese jacket
 , another type of traditional Japanese jacket
 Kimono

Japanese upper-body garments
Japanese words and phrases